Chris Lowe (born 1959) is an English musician.

Chris Lowe may also refer to:

 Chris Lowe (basketball) (born 1987), American college basketball player
 Chris Lowe (biotechnologist), British professor
 Chris Lowe (journalist) (born 1949), British news presenter
 Chris Löwe (born 1989), German footballer
 Christopher Lowe, who died in police custody in Fort Worth, Texas in 2018; see

See also
 Lowe (surname)